Todd White (born May 21, 1975) is a Canadian former professional ice hockey player.

As a hockey player, he played 13 seasons in the National Hockey League (NHL) for the Chicago Blackhawks, Philadelphia Flyers, Ottawa Senators, Minnesota Wild, Atlanta Thrashers and New York Rangers.

After retiring from hockey, he settled in his hometown of Ottawa and operates a mortgage business; he is also a frequent host on local sports radio.

Playing career
White played junior hockey for the Kanata Valley Lazers of the CJHL before heading to Clarkson University on a scholarship. As a senior, he was a finalist for the Hobey Baker Award.

White signed as a free agent with the Chicago Blackhawks on August 6, 1997. That year, he made his NHL debut and scored his first goal. The following year, he played 35 games at the NHL level and scored 13 points. In 1999–2000, Todd played one NHL game with the Blackhawks before being traded on January 26 to the Philadelphia Flyers for a conditional draft pick. He then played three NHL games (one goal) with the Flyers.

On July 12, 2000, White signed as a free agent with the Ottawa Senators. In 16 NHL games that year, he scored four goals. In the post-season, he played his first two playoff games against the Toronto Maple Leafs.

In 2001–02, White joined the NHL ranks full-time. He played in 81 games and scored 20 goals and 50 points. The Senators, however, fell 15 points in the standings and finished third in the Northeast Division. In the playoffs, White scored four points in 12 games as the team reached the second round before losing to the Maple Leafs.

In 2002–03, White finished third on the team with 25 goals and 60 points. He also finished second with 35 assists and a 17.4 shooting percentage. He won the NHL Player of the Month honour for December. In the playoffs, White scored six points in 18 games.  On May 19 in game five of the Eastern Conference final, with the Senators down 3–1 in the series, White scored a goal and earned third-star honours in the team's 3–1 victory on home ice.

In 2003–04, White scored 29 points in 53 games as the Senators finished sixth overall in the league standings. In the playoffs, the Senators lost in the opening round against the Maple Leafs. After that season he was traded to the Minnesota Wild for a fourth round draft pick, where he played until 2007 before being signed to a four-year contract with the Atlanta Thrashers.

In the 2008-09 season, White enjoyed his best statistical season to date playing alongside youngster Bryan Little and prolific goal scorer Ilya Kovalchuk, recording 22 goals along with 51 assists. The trio was known in various hockey circles as the "Little White Russian" line.

On August 2, 2010 White was traded to the New York Rangers for Donald Brashear and Patrick Rissmiller.

Career statistics

Awards and honours

References

External links
 

1975 births
Atlanta Thrashers players
Canadian expatriate ice hockey players in Sweden
Canadian ice hockey centres
Chicago Blackhawks players
Chicago Wolves (IHL) players
Clarkson Golden Knights men's ice hockey players
Cleveland Lumberjacks players
Grand Rapids Griffins (IHL) players
Ice hockey people from Ottawa
Indianapolis Ice players
Living people
Minnesota Wild players
New York Rangers players
Ottawa Senators players
Philadelphia Flyers players
Philadelphia Phantoms players
Södertälje SK players
Undrafted National Hockey League players
AHCA Division I men's ice hockey All-Americans